Goldfinger II: The Man with the Midas Touch is a 1985 role-playing game adventure for James Bond 007 published by Victory Games. The adventure is inspired by the 1959 novel Goldfinger by Ian Fleming and by its 1964 film adaptation, while the title is taken from a lyric of the film's musical theme.

Plot summary
The player characters investigate the disappearance of three physicists and the death of the M.I.6 agent assigned to guard a fourth.

Reception
Steve Crow reviewed Goldfinger II: The Man with the Midas Touch in Space Gamer No. 76. Crow commented that "overall, Goldfinger II, while not the best of Victory's James Bond 007 movie adventures, is far from the worst, and a good addition to any GM's secret agent RPG library."

References

James Bond 007 (role-playing game) adventures
Role-playing game supplements introduced in 1985